Seventy-three Guggenheim Fellowships were awarded in 1940.

1940 U.S. and Canadian Fellows

1940 Latin American and Caribbean Fellows

See also
 Guggenheim Fellowship
 List of Guggenheim Fellowships awarded in 1939
 List of Guggenheim Fellowships awarded in 1941

References

1940
1940 awards